Hassan Raghfawi (born 15 September 1995) is a Saudi Arabian football player who currently plays as a left-back for Al-Ain.

References

External links
 

Living people
1995 births
Association football defenders
Saudi Arabian footballers
Saudi Arabia youth international footballers
Al-Shabab FC (Riyadh) players
Al-Mujazzal Club players
Damac FC players
Al Batin FC players
Al-Kawkab FC players
Al-Ain FC (Saudi Arabia) players
Saudi First Division League players
Sportspeople from Riyadh
Saudi Professional League players